Diego de Souza Andrade (born 17 June 1985), is a Brazilian professional footballer who plays as a striker for Grêmio.

In a journeyman career, he played for ten clubs in the Campeonato Brasileiro Série A, including nine of the Big Twelve, having begun at Fluminense in 2003. He also played for Sport Recife, where he was Série A top scorer in 2016.

Souza also had brief spells in Portugal, Saudi Arabia and Ukraine. He earned seven caps for Brazil from his debut in 2009, scoring twice.

Club career

Early career
Born in Rio de Janeiro, Souza began playing club football for Fluminense in the Campeonato Brasileiro Série A. In May 2005, he signed a five-year deal with Portugal's Benfica. That July he was loaned to Fluminense's rivals Flamengo – the club he supported as a child – until May 2006, with his wages to be split between Benfica and Flamengo.

Souza was loaned for the year 2007 to Grêmio. In May that year, Benfica set a fee of €4 million (R$11 million) if the move were to be made permanent. In that year's Copa Libertadores, he scored in wins over compatriots São Paulo (quarter-final) and Santos (semi-final) as his team finished runners-up.

Palmeiras
In 2008, he moved to Palmeiras (and partner) for €3.75M total fee. He signed a contract until December 2011. Co-currently, along with Lenny, Fluminense transferred its shares on both players' economic rights to Desportivo Brasil (owned by Traffic Group) as part of the deal, made Fluminense gained a profit of R$ 1,320 thousand and R$1,500 thousand respectively. Both players were signed by Palmeiras as part of R$40 million partnership with Traffic, which Palmeiras only owned 10~20% of the rights of Diego.

On 18 April 2009, he received a red card after an argument with Domingos during the state semi finals match against Santos. He later took Domingos down after coming back to the field.

Atlético Mineiro
On 30 June 2010, Atlético Mineiro's president Alexandre Kalil announced the signing of Souza. After the transaction, the club from Belo Horizonte owned 70% of his economic rights and Traffic the rest, with the team having paid reported R$6.6 million (€2.2 million).

Vasco da Gama
On 2 March 2011, Souza signed for Vasco da Gama on a four-year deal. The Rio-based club paid €1.5 million to Atlético who retained 17% of his economic rights, €500,000 to sportswear firm Penalty, and €1.2 million to Traffic. He reached double figures in the national league for the first time with 11 goals, including a hat-trick on 25 September in a 3–0 win at Cruzeiro. The team also won the Copa do Brasil for which he added three more, including one in each leg of a 3–1 aggregate win over Avaí.

Al Ittihad / Cruzeiro
In July 2012, Souza moved back abroad to Al-Ittihad of the Saudi Professional League. He began legal action against the club in October due to unpaid wages. Denied an exit visa from the Middle Eastern kingdom, he sought help from the Brazilian embassy in Riyadh in November.

Cruzeiro signed Souza before the end of 2012, and the transfer was allowed to go through by the following February when FIFA denied an appeal by Al Ittihad. He scored four goals as they came runners-up to his former team Atlético in the Campeonato Mineiro, including two in a 4–0 (5–0 aggregate) home win over Villa Nova in the semi-finals on 28 April.

Metalist Kharkiv / Sport

In July 2013, Souza moved to Metalist Kharkiv in Ukraine, for a fee of €4 million.
In January 2014, he wanted to return to Brazil to escape the 2014 pro-Russian unrest in Ukraine.
A loan deal with Sport Recife was set in September 2014.

At the end of 2015, Souza signed a three-year deal to return to Fluminense after over a decade away. The following 22 March however, he returned to Sport on a deal until the end of 2017. He finished the 2016 Campeonato Brasileiro Série A as one of three joint top scorers with 14 goals in 34 games, equalling a club record from 1984 and becoming only the third Série A top scorer from a northeastern club – the first since Bahia's Charles Fabian in 1990.

Later career
On 7 January 2018, Souza signed for São Paulo on a two-year deal for a fee of R$10 million, with the club obtaining his full economic rights. Seventeen days later, he netted his first goal to open a 2–0 victory against Mirassol in the 2018 Campeonato Paulista. His only national campaign with the Tricolor yielded 12 goals, putting him third in the league's top scorers behind Santos' Gabriel Barbosa and Atlético Mineiro's Ricardo Oliveira.

After losing his place at São Paulo, Souza transferred on 8 March 2019 to Botafogo. This was his 10th Série A club, his 9th of the Big Twelve, and made him the 17th player to represent all four Rio-based members of the latter. His first Série A goal for the club came on 2 June as the only one of a home win against city rivals and former club Vasco.

Souza's contract with Botafogo expired at the start of 2020, and he moved on a free transfer to Grêmio over a decade after leaving the club from Porto Alegre. In the year's Campeonato Gaúcho, he was top scorer with 9 goals in 11 games as his team won the title, including one in the 3–2 aggregate final win over Caxias in August. He scored 13 times in the national league season, four times in the Copa do Brasil and twice in the Copa Libertadores, to end the year as the top scorer in Brazilian football with 28, one more than Flamengo's Gabriel Barbosa.

International career
Souza was part of the Brazil U-23 side in 2007 under coach Dunga. He was in the winning squad of Brazil U-17 at the 2001 South American Under 17 Football Championship in Peru. He played twice in 2005 FIFA World Youth Championship.

In September 2009, Souza was called up for the first time to the senior national team, by coach Dunga for a game against Chile in 2010 FIFA World Cup qualification. He made his debut against Bolivia on 11 October in another qualifier, being replaced at half time by Alex Raphael Meschini in a 2–1 loss in La Paz; it was the nation's first defeat in 16 months. He did not return to the team until 28 September 2011, when he came on as a 68th-minute substitute for Lucas Moura in a 2–0 win over Argentina in the Superclásico de las Américas.

Following his first two caps, Souza had to wait over five years for another opportunity in January 2017, when Tite selected him for a friendly against Colombia based on his form for Sport Recife, and he retained his place for World Cup qualifiers that year. On 13 June that year he scored his first international goals in a 4–0 win over Australia at the Melbourne Cricket Ground, in the eleventh second and in added time.

Career statistics

Club

International

International goals
Scores and results list Brazil's goal tally first.

Honours

Club
Fluminense
Campeonato Carioca: 2005
Primeira Liga: 2016

Flamengo
Copa do Brasil: 2006

Grêmio
Campeonato Gaúcho: 2007, 2020, 2021, 2022
Recopa Gaúcha: 2021, 2022

Palmeiras
Campeonato Paulista: 2008

Vasco da Gama
Copa do Brasil: 2011

Sport
Ariano Suassuna Trophy: 2017
Campeonato Pernambucano: 2017

International
Superclásico de las Américas: 2011

Individual
Campeonato Brasileiro Série A Team of the Year: 2008, 2009, 2011
Campeonato Brasileiro Série A Best Player: 2009
Campeonato Brasileiro Série A Top Goalscorer: 2016

References

External links

 
 
 
 

1985 births
Living people
Brazilian footballers
Brazilian expatriate footballers
Expatriate footballers in Portugal
Expatriate footballers in Saudi Arabia
Expatriate footballers in Ukraine
Footballers from Rio de Janeiro (city)
Fluminense FC players
S.L. Benfica footballers
CR Flamengo footballers
Grêmio Foot-Ball Porto Alegrense players
Sociedade Esportiva Palmeiras players
Clube Atlético Mineiro players
CR Vasco da Gama players
Ittihad FC players
Cruzeiro Esporte Clube players
FC Metalist Kharkiv players
Sport Club do Recife players
São Paulo FC players
Botafogo de Futebol e Regatas players
Campeonato Brasileiro Série A players
Campeonato Brasileiro Série B players
Ukrainian Premier League players
Brazil youth international footballers
Brazil under-20 international footballers
Brazil international footballers
Brazilian expatriate sportspeople in Ukraine
Brazilian expatriate sportspeople in Saudi Arabia
Association football midfielders
Saudi Professional League players